Rodrigo Medina de la Cruz (born September 9, 1972 Monterrey, Nuevo Leon) is Mexican politician affiliated with the Institutional Revolutionary Party (PRI). He served as Governor of Nuevo León from 2009 to 2015. He was linked by Operation Tornado prosecution to legal proceedings against him for embezzlement, property crimes, abuse of authority and unjust enrichment among 14 other public servers, deputies and former deputies as well as relatives and partners of the politician. For that reason he was held in preventive custody on January 26, 2017.

Political career
Medina earned his bachelor's degree from Universidad Regiomontana and his master's from the University of Miami. His political career has been linked to Jose Natividad Gonzalez Paras to whom he served in different positions. In 2006 Medina was elected federal deputy representing the 2nd federal electoral district in Nuevo Leon. In 2009 Medina ran for Governor of Nuevo León; he won defeating PAN candidate Fernando Elizondo Barragan

Medina took office as Governor of Nuevo León on October 4, 2009.

In Coahuila, Humberto Medina worked for the State's PRI administration as a Finance Minister. He wanted to be governor of the state but he was involved in a hospital medical equipment robbery so he was forced to quit the campaign and to move to Nuevo Leon.

In Nuevo Leon Rodrigo worked for the Natividad Gonzalez' Administration and later decided to make a campaign for the State's Government which he won in 2009.

After five and a half years, he took the state's debt from $25,000 Mdp to over $100,000 Mdp.

The newly elect Governor of the state, Jaime Rodriguez on an interview for El Norte said that the finances of the state are orphan (without mother) to express the state of the finances.

During an interview with Hector Benavides host for gossip news for the Multimedios TV network, Rodrigo explained that the debt was good for the people. After the interview he flew on the state's helicopter to McAllen, TX where his children actually go to school.

The FBI and DEA opened an investigation of the Medina family because of the luxury properties they have mainly in San Antonio, TX

Medina denies the charges and he declares that all the wealth he has, has been obtained with his hard work since it hasn't been easy to plan how to get all the money from the state and it required hard work and dedication during the six years period.

His administration ended on October 3, 2015. He has been declared the governor with the highest debt ever for the state of Nuevo Leon since he took the debt from 25,000 Million pesos to an estimated 120,000 Million pesos including short term debt.

References

Living people
Members of the Chamber of Deputies (Mexico) for Nuevo León
Governors of Nuevo León
Institutional Revolutionary Party politicians
Politicians from Monterrey
1972 births
21st-century Mexican politicians
Mexican politicians convicted of crimes
Universidad Regiomontana alumni
University of Miami alumni
Deputies of the LX Legislature of Mexico